Bridgeport is an unincorporated community in Posey Township, Harrison County, Indiana, in the United States.

History
Bridgeport was laid out in 1849.

Caesars Southern Indiana casino has been in operation at Bridgeport since 1998.

References

Unincorporated communities in Harrison County, Indiana
1849 establishments in Indiana
Unincorporated communities in Indiana
Populated places established in 1849